The Star Without a Name is a play by the Romanian author Mihail Sebastian, completed in 1942. Two movies were based on this play: Mona, l'étoile sans nom (1965, in French), starring Marina Vlady, and Bezymyannaya zvezda (1978, in Russian) directed by and starring Mikhail Kozakov.

See also
 List of Romanian plays

1942 plays
Romanian plays